Bonnet Carré may refer to:

 Bonnet Carré Spillway, a flood control structure in Louisiana
 Bonnet Carré Crevasse, 1871 Mississippi River levee failure and associated flood